Cuna de lobos (English: Cradle of Wolves) is a Mexican television series produced by Giselle González for Televisa. It is a reboot based on the 1986 Mexican telenovela of the same title and the second production of the Fábrica de sueños franchise. The series stars Paz Vega, Gonzalo García Vivanco, and Paulette Hernández. It premiered on 7 October 2019, and consists of 25 episodes.

The series revolves around Catalina Creel, whose great beauty is only surpassed by her cruelty, will go to any lengths to secure her fortune and bloodline. Filming of the production began on 15 April 2019 and concluded in July 2019.

Plot 
Catalina Creel (Paz Vega), matriarch of the Larios family, celebrates with her son Alejandro (Diego Amozurrutia) and her husband Carlos (Leonardo Daniel) the anniversary of the Gothier jewelers. Leonora (Paulette Hernández), a spontaneous graphic journalist, arrives to cover the event and a connection emerges between her and Alejandro. Catalina has absolute control in the family emporium, managing to banish her stepson José Carlos (Gonzalo García Vivanco), son of Carlos's first marriage with Gloria, who died years ago, in addition to her husband Carlos professing her an unconditional love. After the celebration, Catalina and Carlos prepare to enjoy a second honeymoon trip aboard their yacht, but the romantic atmosphere is broken after the abrupt call Carlos receives from a mysterious man, risking the gruesome plan that Catalina has built for years. Carlos refuses to believe the man, but he gives him revealing evidence. Hurt and full of anger, he confronts Catalina, who denies the accusation. However, given the unquestionable evidence, she ends up cynically accepting her guilt. The revelation affects the heart problem that Carlos has had for years, causing him a strong crisis. Catalina uses his crisis to finally get rid of him. Catalina contemplates how Carlos's body is lost in the sea

After Carlos's funeral, the family lawyer makes the reading of the will, which stipulates a clear and forced clause addressed to both his son's: the first one to give him a grandson of his blood will be the universal heir of all his emporium, this way to ensure the continuity of the Larios family. Although it seems that Alejandro has an advantage because of the addictions of José Carlos, the reality is that Alejandro keeps a dark secret that endangers him taking the inheritance. Since years ago Alejandro maintains a double life, he has a secret relationship with another man, Miguel. Catalina has never confronted him, however, with the inheritance in danger, she demands him to start an affair with Leonora, so she can be used to conceive the son they need. Catalina faces many problems, besides the complications of her sons double life, including the harassment of Luis (Osvaldo de León), an honest reporter who seeks to reveal the illegal businesses that occur within Gothier and the mysterious death of Carlos Larios; she must also confront her stepson José Carlos, who knows the plan that she and Alejandro have. José Carlos intends to prevent Leonora from being used to seize the inheritance. Catalina, in her obsession with the power of the Gothier jewelers, begins to cover her path with cruel murders to get rid of anyone who intends to get in her way.

José Carlos, has overcome his addictions with the help of Leonora, and thanks to the secret love he feels for her, has become more involved in the businesses of Gothier jewelry stores, and discovers financial transactions that lead to a network of gemstone traffickers from Sierra Leone, Africa. Aware of the situation, Catalina looks for a way to banish him again from the company and the family home. Catalina celebrates Alejandro's marriage with Leonora and boasts of her triumph. José Carlos decides to travel to Sierra Leone, where he finds out that this dirty business has materialized at the cost of the exploitation of men, women and even children, sheltered by an important group of high-level officials within and out of the country. Things begin to get complicated for Catalina, who is becoming a more bloodthirsty being. Months later, Leonora gives birth to little Edgar. After the birth, Alejandro loses interest in Leonora and his son, and is determined to recover Miguel (José Pablo Minor), endangering Catalina's plans and the inheritance she already feels at her fingertips.

With the birth of Édgar, Leonora becomes an obstacle, because she has seen who Catalina really is; in addition to this, she discovers the secret relationship that Alejandro has had for years with Miguel, understanding that she was only used to have a son they needed to win the family fortune. Catalina decides to forge a plan by getting Leonora locked up in prison and putting Alejandro against her, who visits her in her cell and swears that he will make her pay by never letting her see her son again. Leonora feels that she is going crazy by seeing that Edgar is taken away. She begs José Carlos to help her out of prison and recover her baby. José Carlos, with the help of Luis, will start a race against time to get Leonora free and show that Catalina is the same person behind all the crimes.

Cast and characters

Main 
 Paz Vega as Catalina Creel, Carlos' wife, and Alejandro's mother.
 Paulette Hernández as Leonora Navarro, she is photographer of the newspaper La Verdad.
 Gonzalo García Vivanco as José Carlos Larios, Carlos' alcoholic son.
 Diego Amozurrutia as Alejandro Larios, Catalina's bisexual son.
 Nailea Norvind as Ámbar Reyes, Francisco's wife.
 Flavio Medina as Francisco Larios, Carlos' brother and Catalina's lover.
 Azela Robinson as Gélica Andrade, the housekeeper of the Larios house.
 Carlos Aragón as Diego Solórzano, Catalina's accomplice.
 José Pablo Minor as Miguel Terranova Contreras, Alejandro's boyfriend.
 Osvaldo de León as Luis Guzmán, reporter friend of Leonora.
 Leonardo Daniel as Carlos Larios, patriarch of the Larios family.

Guest stars 
 Paulina Treviño as Margarita, Luis' wife.
 Emma Escalante as Mora, Alejandro's girlfriend, who resides in Madrid, Spain.
 Matías Luzbik as Matías Guzmán, Luis' son.
 Fernando Larrañaga
 Miroslava
 Adalberto Parra
 Juan Carlos Vives

Ratings

Mexico ratings 
 
}}

U.S. ratings 
  
}}

Episodes 
The title of each episode refers to a phrase mentioned by a character in it.

Special 

Notes

Awards and nominations

References

External links 
 

2019 Mexican television series debuts
2019 Mexican television series endings
Mexican drama television series
Television series by Televisa
Spanish-language television shows
Mexican LGBT-related television shows
Television shows set in Mexico City
Cultural depictions of women
Television series about dysfunctional families
Gay-related television shows
Serial drama television series
Television series reboots
2010s LGBT-related drama television series
Bisexuality-related television series